Aconitum bucovinense is a species of monkshood in the buttercup family Ranunculaceae, native to the Carpathians. Although itself rare, it is a parent of Aconitum × nanum with Aconitum firmum.

References

bucovinense
Flora of Poland
Flora of Ukraine
Flora of Romania
Plants described in 1908